is a Japanese rugby union player who plays as a winger. He also plays for Top League side the Panasonic Wild Knights in his home country.

Career

Yamada has been a prolific try-scorer for the Wild Knights in Japan's Top 14 competition since making his debut during the 2010-11 season.   He enjoyed a stand-out year in 2012-13 scoring 20 tries in 14 games to be the league's top scorer.

Ahead of the admission of a Japanese franchise into Super Rugby, Australian sides were permitted to contract one Japanese player per season to aid their development.   And so it was that the Perth-based Western Force signed Yamada to a one-year contract ahead of the 2015 Super Rugby season.

International career

To date he has scored 8 tries in 10 international matches.

References

External links 
 

1985 births
Living people
Japanese rugby union players
Japan international rugby union players
Japanese expatriate rugby union players
Japanese expatriate sportspeople in Australia
Expatriate rugby union players in Australia
Rugby union wings
Saitama Wild Knights players
Sportspeople from Kitakyushu
Sunwolves players
Asian Games medalists in rugby union
Rugby union players at the 2006 Asian Games
Asian Games gold medalists for Japan
Medalists at the 2006 Asian Games
Urayasu D-Rocks players
Seattle Seawolves players
Kyuden Voltex players